Tyrannodoris tigris is a species of sea slug, a polycerid nudibranch, a marine gastropod mollusk in the family Polyceridae. It is a known predator of Tambje eliora and Tambje abdere, two species of smaller nudibranchs. The chemical extracts of all three species contain tambjamines, which were traced to Sessibugula translucens, a food source of these species. It is hypothesized that tambjamines are a chemical defence mechanism against feeding by the spotted kelpfish Gibbonsia elegans.

Distribution
This species is found in the Gulf of California to Bahia de Banderas.

Description
Tyrannodoris tigris can grow as large as 30 cm in length. Like other nudibranchs in the genus Tyrannodoris, it is carnivorous and predatory, feeding on other sea slugs.

References

Polyceridae
Gastropods described in 1978